Abrar Hussain  (February 9, 1961 – June 16, 2011) was a professional Pakistani welterweight and Light-middleweight boxer. Hussain represented Pakistan at the 1984, 1988, and 1992 Summer Olympics. In 1985 South Asian Games, he won a Gold medal for Pakistan in Dhaka. In 1990 Asian Games, Hussain secured Gold medal in boxing for Pakistan. He also represented his country at the 1990 Commonwealth Games.

He was the Deputy Director of Pakistan Sports Board and chairman of the Provincial Sports Board in Pakistani province of Balochistan. He was shot dead outside of his office in the southwestern city of Quetta on June 16, 2011 by two unknown gunmen on a motorbike He belonged to a minority ethnic group of Hazara and followed the Shia sect of Islam. His killing was allegedly inspired by sectarianism.

Early life
Hussain was born February 9, 1961, in Mehrabad, Alamdar Road, a Hazara ethnic neighborhood in the southwestern city of Quetta, Pakistan. Some sources list his birth date as February 9, 1965.

Career
In 1983 Hussain made his international debut in Asian Boxing Championship in Japan where he won a bronze medal.

In 1984 Hussain represented Pakistan in Summer Olympics in Los Angeles. He participated in boxing men's welterweight and was ranked 17T.

In 1988, Hussain represented Pakistan in Summer Olympics in Seoul, South Korea. He participated in men's Light-middleweight and was ranked 9T.

In 1992 Hussain represented Pakistan in Summer Olympics in Barcelona, Spain. He participated in men's Light-middleweight was ranked 17T.

In 1985 Hussain represented Pakistan in South Asian Games in 1985 South Asian Games in Dhaka, Bangladesh and won a gold medal.

In 1990 Hussain represented Pakistan in the Asian Games of 1990 and won a gold medal.

Awards
 Sitara-i-Imtiaz (Star of Excellence) by the President of Pakistan in 1989.
Pride of Performance by the President of Pakistan.
 President's Gold Medal by the President of Pakistan in 1991.

Death
Hussain was shot dead outside of his office near Ayub National Stadium, on June 16, 2011, by unidentified gunmen on a motorbike. He was shot several times and also received a bullet in the head he was rushed to the nearest hospital but died before any medical assistance was given to him. The banned Pakistani sectarian, terrorist militant group Lashkar-e-Jhangvi (LeJ) claimed the responsibility for his killing.

Funeral
Hussain's body was taken to his home in a procession, and a very large number of people attended his funeral. He was buried in Behesht-e-Zainab Hazara cemetery on Alamdar road, Quetta.

Responses
No arrests were made by police and a demonstration was held by  a large number of people from the Shia Hazara community demanding the arrest of the killers.

The Chief Minister and Governor expressed grief at his death.

The Pakistan Boxing Federation named his death an irreparable loss to the sport. Pakistani boxer Muhammad Waseem expressed grief and said that it was a huge loss. The PBF postponed the national tournaments including NBP National Ranking Tournament in Quetta and the Youth boxing tournament in Karachi.

References

External links
 

1961 births
2011 deaths
2011 murders in Asia
Asian Games medalists in boxing
Boxers at the 1984 Summer Olympics
Boxers at the 1988 Summer Olympics
Boxers at the 1992 Summer Olympics
Commonwealth Games competitors for Pakistan
Deaths by firearm in Balochistan, Pakistan
Pakistani people of Hazara descent
Hazara sportspeople
Male murder victims
Olympic boxers of Pakistan
Pakistani murder victims
Pakistani Shia Muslims
Sportspeople from Quetta
People murdered in Balochistan, Pakistan
Boxers at the 1986 Asian Games
Boxers at the 1990 Asian Games
Boxers at the 1990 Commonwealth Games
Pakistani male boxers
Medalists at the 1986 Asian Games
Medalists at the 1990 Asian Games
Asian Games gold medalists for Pakistan
Asian Games bronze medalists for Pakistan
South Asian Games gold medalists for Pakistan
South Asian Games medalists in boxing
Light-middleweight boxers
Recipients of the Pride of Performance
Recipients of Sitara-i-Imtiaz